The Guard may refer to:

 The Guard (TV series), a Canadian drama series portraying about the Canadian Coast Guard
 The Guard (1990 film), a 1990 Soviet film about a soldier who kills his entire unit
 The Guard (2001 film), a 2001 experimental Indian Malayalam film about a forest guard
 The Guard (2011 film), a 2011 Irish buddy cop comedy 
 The Guard (novel), 2008 Arabic-language novel by Ezzat el Kamhawi, about a presidential guard being subsumed into the system

See also
 Guard (disambiguation)
 Guardian (disambiguation)